The seventeenth season of the American television series Whose Line Is It Anyway? premiered on The CW on January 8, 2021, and concluded on April 16, 2021.

Production
On May 14, 2020, it was announced that the series would air new episodes for a new season in January 2021. On October 29, 2020, it was announced that the new season would premiere on January 8, 2021.

Cast

Recurring 
 Greg Proops (two episodes)
 Jonathan Mangum (two episodes)
 Jeff Davis (two episodes)
 Gary Anthony Williams (two episodes)
 Nyima Funk (one episode)
 Heather Anne Campbell (one episode)

Episodes 

"Winner(s)" of each episode as chosen by host Aisha Tyler are highlighted in italics. The winner(s) perform a sketch during the credit roll, just like in the original UK series.

References 

Whose Line Is It Anyway?
2021 American television seasons